MBC Plus is a South Korean company under MBC, producing media, broadcast and telecommunication products for non free-to-air networks, including Skylife and 'Cable TV' (KCTA) service providers. Corporate slogan is "Let's plus!".

Television networks 
 MBC Dramanet (Also Known As MBC Drama) - for Drama and Entertainment programs.
 MBC Sports+ - for sports (both professionals and amateurs).
 MBC every1 - Entertainment channel for both Variety Programs. (Formerly MBC Movies)
 MBC M - for Music. (Formerly MBC Game and MBC Music)
 MBC On - for Classic MBC Shows. (Formerly MBC Sports+ 2)

Former networks
 MBC Game - for E-sport (online game, especially for youth). (Formerly LOOK TV and GEMBC)
 MBC Life - Documentary channel for life cultures. (Formerly Alice TV)
 MBC QueeN - mostly organizes program for women. (Formerly MBC Life)
 MBC Sports+ 2 - for sports (both professionals and amateurs). (Formerly MBC QueeN)

See also 
 Economy of South Korea
 List of South Korean companies
 Communications in South Korea

Programs with MBC & MBC plus media
 Real Man - MBC
 Dad! Where are you going? - MBC
 We Got Married - MBC

External links 
 MBC Plus Media (Korean)

Munhwa Broadcasting Corporation subsidiaries
Broadcasting companies of South Korea
Companies based in Seoul
Mass media companies established in 1993
1993 establishments in South Korea